The International Association for the Study of Scottish Literatures (IASSL, Scottish Gaelic: Comann Eadar-Nàiseanta airson Sgrùdadh Litreachas na h-Alba; Scots: Warldwide Associat for the Clerk Leir o braid Scotland’s Leid and Scrievin) is the official global association aimed at the promotion of Scottish literature in English, Gaelic, Scots, and Latin on the international level. It is registered as a Scottish charity (SC044410).

World Congress of Scottish Literatures 
The Association was launched at the First World Congress of Scottish Literatures in Glasgow in 2014, opened by the Education Secretary Michael Russell and the Chancellor Sir Kenneth Calman. The logo was designed by Dr Craig Lamont, now Lecturer in Scottish Studies at the University of Glasgow. Selected Proceedings from the 2014 Congress were edited by Klaus Peter Muller and his colleagues and published in Mainz in 2017 under the title Inspiring Views from 'a' the airts', with a Preface by the founder Murray Pittock. So far, three world congresses have been held, with the fourth planned for Nottingham in 2024:

 University of Glasgow, Glasgow, Scotland, 2-5 July 2014
 Simon Fraser University, Vancouver, Canada, 21-25 June 2017
 Charles University, Prague, Czech Republic, 22-26 June 2022

Jack Medal 
In 2018, the Association launched the Jack Medal, named in honour of Professor Ronald Dyce Sadler Jack (1941-2016), a leading expert on Scottish literature and medieval literature who taught at the University of Edinburgh from 1987-2004. The medal is awarded every year for the best newly published academic article on a subject dealing with Scottish literature and related to reception and/or diaspora.

Jack Medal Awardees

 2018: Nikki Hessell, Stephen Clothier
 2019: Céline Sabiron
 2020: Anna Fancett
 2021: Bryony Coombs

Convenors of the Association 

 Prof. Murray Pittock, University of Glasgow (2014-2017)
 Prof. Caroline McCracken-Flesher, University of Wyoming (2017-2020)
 Prof. Carla Sassi, University of Verona (2020-2023)

See also 

 Association for Scottish Literary Studies
 Scottish literature

External Links 

 official website
 official YouTube channel (lectures and seminars)

References 

Scottish culture
Scottish literature
Languages of Scotland
Charities based in Scotland
2014 establishments in Scotland
International organisations based in the United Kingdom